The Battle of Würzburg was fought on 3 September 1796 between an army of the Habsburg monarchy led by Archduke Charles, Duke of Teschen and an army of the First French Republic led by Jean-Baptiste Jourdan. The French attacked the archduke's forces, but they were resisted until the arrival of reinforcements decided the engagement in favor of the Austrians. The French retreated west toward the Rhine River. The action occurred during the War of the First Coalition, part of the French Revolutionary Wars.

The summer of 1796 saw the two French armies of Jourdan and Jean Victor Marie Moreau advance into southern Germany. They were opposed by Archduke Charles, who supervised two weaker Austrian armies commanded by Wilhelm von Wartensleben and Maximilian Anton Karl, Count Baillet de Latour. At the Battle of Amberg on 24 August, Charles managed to concentrate superior numbers against Jourdan, forcing him to withdraw. At Würzburg, Jourdan attempted a counterattack in a bid to halt his retreat. After his defeat, Charles forced Jourdan's army back to the Rhine. With his colleague in retreat, Moreau was isolated and compelled to abandon southern Germany.

Battle
The French army advanced against what they thought to be an isolated Austrian division under Feldmarschall-Leutnant Anton Sztáray. Jourdan's plan was to attack Sztáray with the divisions of Generals of Division Jean-Baptiste Bernadotte and Jean Étienne Championnet, leaving the divisions of Generals of Division Jacques Bonnaud and Paul Grenier in reserve. However, the early morning mist enabled Archduke Charles to bring up the division of Feldmarschall-Leutnant Friedrich Freiherr von Hotze as a reinforcement to Sztáray, effectively undoing what Jourdan thought to be a great numerical superiority for the French.

Jourdan's imagined superiority diminished even more when the division of General-Major Anton von Elsnitz to the north kept the much larger force under General of Division François Joseph Lefebvre out of the battle. Meanwhile, Austrian engineers were laying pontoon bridges over the Main in order to let the remainder of the Habsburg army cross the river. The French attacked the Austrian position without success until the Austrian divisions of Feldmarschall-Leutnant Paul Kray and Feldzeugmeister Wilhelm von Wartensleben arrived and drove the French off the field.

Result

Army of the Lower Rhine

The French suffered 2,000 killed and wounded, plus 1,000 men and 7 guns captured. The Austrians lost 1,200 killed and wounded, with 300 captured. The Battle of Würzburg determined the winner of the 1796 campaign in southern Germany. Charles pursued the beaten French, turning Jourdan's south flank and keeping between him and General of Division Jean Victor Marie Moreau's French Army of Rhin-et-Moselle in southern Germany.

On 7 September, Charles forced the French to lift the siege of Mainz. By 16 September, the opposing armies were back on the Lahn River where they started the campaign in June. On that day, Kray with 11,000 Austrians defeated 15,000 Frenchmen of Jourdan's army at Limburg an der Lahn. The French general fell back to Düsseldorf and crossed to the west bank of the Rhine. The French gave up their siege of the Ehrenbreitstein fortress on 17 September. Charles left 30,000 soldiers with the Army of the Lower Rhine, placed them under the command Feldmarschall-Leutnant Franz von Werneck, and hurried south.

Army of the Upper Rhine
Having disposed of Jourdan's army, the Austrian archduke forced Moreau's now-isolated army to retreat west through the Black Forest to France. On 18 September, an Austrian division under Feldmarschall-Leutnant Franz Petrasch stormed the Rhine bridgehead at Kehl, but was driven out by a French counterattack. At this time, Moreau's army was still south of Ulm. On 2 October, Moreau defeated Feldzeugmeister Maximilian Anton Karl, Count Baillet de Latour's Army of the Upper Rhine at the  Battle of Biberach. While French casualties numbered only 500, they inflicted 300 killed and wounded, while capturing 4,000 soldiers and 18 cannon. This slowed the southern Austrian pursuit, but with Charles rushing south to cut him off from France, Moreau retreated to the Rhine.

On 19 October, Moreau with 32,000 soldiers fought Charles with 28,000 Austrians at the Battle of Emmendingen. The French suffered 1,000 killed and wounded, including General of Division Michel de Beaupuy killed. In addition, the Austrians captured 1,800 men and 2 cannons. The Austrians losses totaled 1,000, including Feldzeugmeister Wilhelm von Wartensleben killed.

The French withdrew south and fought the Battle of Schliengen on 24 October. This time, the Austrians lost 800 while inflicting 1,200 casualties on the French. Both sides claimed victory, but Moreau retreated to the west bank of the Rhine. Moreau soon offered Charles an armistice, which the field marshal wanted to accept. At this time, the Austrian government made a huge error by refusing to ratify the agreement. That fall and winter, while Charles reduced the fortresses of Kehl and Huningen, the French government transferred 14 demi-brigades from Moreau to General of Division Napoleon Bonaparte to help the latter bring the Siege of Mantua to a successful conclusion.

Order of battle

French Army
 Army of Sambre-et-Meuse: General of Division Jean-Baptiste Jourdan
 25,000 infantry, 5,000 cavalry, 11 artillery batteries 
 Division: General of Division François Joseph Lefebvre
 Division: General of Division Paul Grenier
 Division: General of Division Jean Étienne Championnet
 Division: General of Division Jean-Baptiste Bernadotte
 Cavalry Reserve: General of Division Jacques Philippe Bonnaud

Habsburg Army

 Army of the Lower Rhine: Feldmarschall Archduke Charles (30,000)
 Division: Feldmarschall-Leutnant Friedrich Freiherr von Hotze
 Mixed Brigade: General-Major Michael von Kienmayer
 Infantry Brigade: General-Major Johann von Hiller
 Cavalry Brigade: Oberst Anton Canisius
 Division: Feldmarschall-Leutnant Anton Sztáray
 Mixed Brigade: General-Major Prince Johann of Liechtenstein  
 Infantry Brigade: General-Major Eugen Montfrault
 Bavarian Infantry Brigade: General-Major Bartels
 Grenadier Brigade: General-Major Konrad Valentin von Kaim
 Division: Feldmarschall-Leutnant Johann Sigismund Riesch
 Cavalry Brigade: General-Major Prince Alexander of Württemberg
 Cavalry Brigade: General-Major Joseph Spiegelberg
 Division: Feldmarschall-Leutnant Paul Kray
 Cavalry Brigade: General-Major Friedrich Hohenlohe-Ingelfingen
 Cavalry Brigade: General-Major Karl Joseph Hadik von Futak
 Infantry Brigade: General-Major Franz Sebottendorf
 Infantry Brigade: General-Major Prince Friedrich of Orange
 Infantry Brigade: Feldmarschall-Leutnant Joseph Staader
 Reserve: Feldzeugmeister Wilhelm von Wartensleben
 Grenadier Brigade: General-Major Johann Kollowrat
 Grenadier Brigade: General-Major Joseph von Schellenberg
 Grenadier Brigade: General-Major Ludwig von Vogelsang
 Cavalry Brigade: General-Major Prince Franz Seraph of Rosenberg-Orsini
 Cavalry Brigade: Feldmarschall-Leutnant Karl of Lorraine-Lambesc

Notes

References

See also

External links

Conflicts in 1796
Battles involving Austria
1796 in Austria
1796 in France
Battles of the War of the First Coalition
1796 in the Holy Roman Empire